G. Srinivasan was an Indian actor, writer, director who predominantly appeared in Tamil language films. He was a supporting and villain actor during the 1970s and 1980s. He has acted over 200 films in Tamil, Telugu, Malayalam. He made his debut as lead villain in Bharathiraja's  Puthiya Vaarpugal (1979). His wife Choreographer Puliyur Saroja was a popular choreographer during 70's and 80's, 90s. They have their own educational institutions.

Film career 
He had written eight films and directed three films. He started as an assistant to Adurthi Subba Rao and have worked as an associate to various other directors such as Dada Mirasi and K. Viswanath. He has played villain roles and character roles in over a hundred films, including the Ranuva Veeran in Tamil and the Penmani Aval Kanmani. He has also acted in Malayalam and Telugu.

Family 
He married choreographer Puliyar Saroja. Their only son died in a road accident a few years ago.

Arrest 
Saroja and Srinivasan run a school called Sathya Matriculation School in Ramamavaram area. Swadhirajan, a 5-year-old boy, collapsed and died in a waste water tank at the school. The police registered the case and investigated. Subsequently, the school founder, actor Srinivasan, was arrested by the police for allegedly negligently shutting down the waste water tank.

Filmography 
This is a partial filmography. You can expand it.

1970s

1980s

1990s

2010s

References

External links 
 

Year of birth missing (living people)
Living people
Tamil actors